Park East Synagogue is located on the Upper East Side of Manhattan, in New York City.

Building 
The building was built in 1889–1890. The architects were Schneider and Herter, who designed numerous tenements on New York's Lower East Side as well as in the Hell's Kitchen neighborhoods.

The building is built in the Moorish Revival style and features a prominent rose window. One of its most remarkable characteristics is the asymmetrical twin towers, as the eastern tower is taller. In comparison, most other synagogues of the period featured twin towers of similar height. The towers are also adorned differently. Each of the towers originally was also topped by a bulbous dome that has since been removed. It is one of fewer than a hundred surviving nineteenth-century American synagogues. The synagogue building is listed on the National Register of Historic Places.

Over the doorway, engraved in granite and written in Hebrew, is a verse from Psalm 100.  "Enter into His Gates with Thanksgiving and into His courts with praise."

History 
Congregation Zichron Ephraim was established by Rabbi Bernard Drachman and Jonas Weil to promote Orthodox Judaism as an alternative to Reform Judaism popular on the Upper East Side.

Rabbi Drachman served as spiritual leader for fifty-one years. He died in 1945. Rabbi Zev Zahavy was appointed rabbi of the synagogue on September 1, 1952. He was known as a dynamic spokesman for Orthodox Judaism and many of his sermons were reported on in the New York Times. He and his wife Edith, a noted educator, founded the Park East Day School. On March 16, 1957, Robert Briscoe, the Jewish Lord Mayor of Dublin, carrying his tallis bag, visited and prayed at the synagogue on Shabbos morning.

Since 1962, the synagogue's rabbi has been Arthur Schneier. Rabbi Schneier serves Park East Synagogue full-time while also drawing a salary from the Appeal of Conscience Foundation he founded. This leadership structure was criticized in 2021 by Daniel L. Kurtz, former head of the Charities Bureau at the New York State Attorney General’s Office, when he alleged that Park East has failed to hold regular membership meetings to ensure financial transparency. Kurtz also alleged that Park East’s trustees are directly appointed not elected, in a process which he has called “blatantly illegal”.

Rabbi Harold Einsidler is the religious spiritual organizer; his wife Toby is the office and youth leader. The synagogue's chief cantor is Yitzchak Meir Helfgot. The synagogue's executive director is Benny Rogosnitzky, who has a history of allegations of embezzlements from several charities, one of which involved a "massive money-laundering scheme" according to the New York Post and the New York Daily News.

The October 2021 dismissal of Rabbi Benjamin Goldschmidt, who had served as Park East's Assistant Rabbi for ten years, sparked a protest within the synagogue community and a public objection from Israeli Government minister Yoel Razvozov.

Activities 
The Park East Day School now educates children from early childhood through eighth grade.

In 2008, Pope Benedict XVI visited the synagogue in the midst of a visit to New York City. This was the third papal visit to a synagogue and the only such visit in the United States of America. The Pope was given a box of matzahs and a silver Seder plate (it was almost Passover when the visit occurred); members of both the Catholic and Jewish religions wore their respective skullcaps.

In 2016, the synagogue was the subject of international press coverage when members of the synagogue heckled and jeered U.N. Director General Ban Ki-moon as he gave an address in honor of International Holocaust Remembrance Day. In his speech, he called the Holocaust a "colossal crime" and added that he is "deeply disturbed by the massacres in South Sudan, by the continued carnage in Syria, and by the atrocities being inflicted by Daesh and Boko Haram." Earlier he had criticized Israel's occupation of the West Bank, and congregants were angry regarding his criticism of Israel, claiming it promoted terrorism. He later repeated his criticism of Israel but added that he in no way condoned terrorism.

Notable members
 Bernard Drachman
 Yitzchak Meir Helfgot
 Henry H. Minskoff
 Tamir Sapir
 Edwin Schlossberg
 Arthur Schneier
 Stuart Subotnick

See also
 List of New York City Designated Landmarks in Manhattan from 14th to 59th Streets
 National Register of Historic Places listings in Manhattan from 14th to 59th Streets

References

External links

Upper East Side
Synagogues completed in 1890
Moorish Revival synagogues
Modern Orthodox synagogues in the United States
Properties of religious function on the National Register of Historic Places in Manhattan
New York City Designated Landmarks in Manhattan
Synagogues in Manhattan
Romanesque Revival architecture in New York City
Byzantine Revival architecture in New York City
Orthodox synagogues in New York City
Moorish Revival architecture in New York City
Romanesque Revival synagogues
Synagogues on the National Register of Historic Places in New York City
1890 establishments in New York (state)